Bosley Run is a  long 1st order tributary to Cross Creek in Brooke County, West Virginia.  This is the only stream of this name in the United States.

Variant names
According to the Geographic Names Information System, it has also been known historically as:
Bolsey Run

Course
Bosley Run rises about 1 mile west of Mechling Hill, in Brooke County, West Virginia and then flows south-southwest to join Cross Creek about 0.5 miles northeast of Rockdale.

Watershed
Bosley Run drains  of area, receives about 40.0 in/year of precipitation, has a wetness index of 315.01, and is about 62% forested.

See also
List of Rivers of West Virginia

References

Rivers of West Virginia
Rivers of Brooke County, West Virginia